The National Archives of Hungary (in Hungarian: Magyar Nemzeti Levéltár) were created in 1756. They were first located in Pressburg. In 1784, they were transferred to Buda.

The National Archives of Hungary is the nation's record keeper. Archival work in the 21st century is to collect, to catalog, and to restore historic documents, but also to serve the needs of society and the citizens, and provide them assistance in their research into history. These valuable records are preserved and made available for you if you want to research your family’s history or a historical topic that interests you.

See also
Ottoman Archives
Venice State Archive
Dubrovnik Archive
List of national archives
Leopold Óváry

References

External links 
National Archives of Hungary

Hungary
Hungarian culture
Archives in Hungary
Buda Castle